Wild Kingdom was a wildlife documentary series that originally ran from 1963 to 1988.

Episodes

Season 1: 1963

Season 2: 1963–1964

Season 3: 1964

Season 4: 1965

Season 5: 1966

Season 6: 1967

Season 7: 1969

Season 8: 1970–1971

Season 9: 1971

Season 10: 1972

Season 11: 1973

Season 12: 1974

Season 13: 1975

Season 14: 1976

Season 15: 1977

Season 16: 1978

Season 17: 1978-1979

Season 18: 1980

Season 19: 1981

Season 20: 1982

Season 21: 1983

Season 22: 1984

Season 23: 1985

Season 24: 1986

Season 25: 1987

References

Lists of American non-fiction television series episodes